is a free-to-play, digital collectible card game developed by Konami for the iOS, Android and Microsoft Windows platforms, based on the Yu-Gi-Oh! Trading Card Game. After an initial beta period, the game was first released in Japan on November 17, 2016, and then released to the rest of the world on January 11, 2017. The Windows version was released worldwide via Steam on November 17, 2017.

Plot
Duel Links features characters from the entire Yu-Gi-Oh! Duel Monsters anime series. Seto Kaiba has created a virtual reality "Duel World" in order to gather the best duelists so they can compete. Players first have the option to play as either Yami Yugi or Seto Kaiba. As they continue to win duels, other characters become unlocked, including the character the player did not choose at the beginning.

Gameplay
The game uses a format known as "Speed Duels" which uses the rules of the trading card game with various modifications. Players have 4000 Life Points, the Main Phase 2 is removed, the number of Monster Zones and Spell/Trap Zones is reduced from 5 to 3, the Main Deck's size is reduced from 40-60 cards each to 20-30 cards each and the Extra Deck is reduced from 15 to 5 (although this number can be increased to 8 by completing certain missions), and players start with a 4 card hand instead of 5. Players can also use Skills that affect duels in various ways. These effects include but are not limited to adding cards to the hand or field, increasing monster stats, increasing life points, adding cards to the deck at the start of the duel, changing the player's starting hand, and revealing the contents of face-down cards. The winner of a duel either reduces their opponent's life points to 0, allows their opponent to run out of cards, or win under special conditions. Players are rewarded with experience points and various items after a duel, with more items earned from winning.

The game has the player in a hub where they can choose various NPCs to duel against. From here they can also access the Gate which allows them to duel against Legendary Duelists. The current stage the player is on will also be displayed. By completing missions within the stage, players can advance to the next stage which will gradually unlock more difficult opponents and Legendary Duelists at the Gate. Progressing in stages will allow the player to unlock Character Unlock Missions as well.

By completing Character Unlock Missions, players can unlock new Legendary Duelists to play as. Legendary Duelists are based on key characters from the Yu-Gi-Oh series, such as Joey Wheeler, Maximilion Pegasus, Chazz Princeton, and Dr. Vellian Crowler. Each Legendary Duelist comes with their signature card and unique skills.

New cards can be obtained for the player's decks from either Legendary Duelists, the in-game Card Trader using various items or from card packs. Card packs are purchased from the in-game shop using Gems. Card packs can also be purchased with real money via microtransactions. The possible contents of a card pack can vary depending on which BOX the player chooses to buy from. Each card has a probability of being pulled based on their rarity. Common N and R cards tend to have weaker effects, while rarer SR and UR cards have stronger effects. The card pool released at launch includes many cards recognizable from the Yu-Gi-Oh! Duel Monsters anime. As more BOXes were added over time, the card pool expanded to include many cards from more modern Yu-Gi-Oh sets.

At launch, the game's format did not include any cards that would facilitate the original card game's more modern special summoning effects, including Synchro, Xyz, Pendulum, and Link Summoning, making the gameplay closely resemble the original Yu-Gi-Oh anime series. On September 28, 2017, GX World was added to the game, introducing many characters and cards from the Yu-Gi-Oh! GX anime series, as well as a focus on Fusion summoning. As of September 25, 2018, the 3.0 update added 5D'S world to the game, introducing characters and cards from the Yu-Gi-Oh! 5D's anime as well as implementing Synchro Summoning in the game. On September 26, 2019, DSOD world based on the movie Yu-Gi-Oh!: The Dark Side of Dimensions was added. On September 29, 2020, ZEXAL World from Yu-Gi-Oh! ZEXAL was added with the addition of Xyz summoning. On September 28, 2021, Arc-V World from Yu-Gi-Oh! Arc-V was added with the addition of Pendulum summoning. On September 28, 2022, VRAINS World from Yu-Gi-Oh! VRAINS was added with the addition of Link summoning.

The game also includes a PvP mode where players can duel in real-time with friends, as well as participate in random matches with players around the world. There is also a ranked ladder where players compete for rank and prizes including tickets which can be used to exchange for certain cards.

Special events often occur for a limited amount of time to provide variety and the opportunity to win rare cards and unlock new Legendary Duelists. These events typically have special opponents with goals and missions that must be completed in order to earn the rewards Cards and characters exclusive to events are usually made available outside of the event at a later date.

Characters
The current roster of playable characters for the game consists of the original series, Yu-Gi-Oh!, Yu-Gi-Oh! GX, Yu-Gi-Oh! 5DS, Yu-Gi-Oh! The Dark Side of Dimensions, Yu-Gi-Oh! ZEXAL, Yu-Gi-Oh! Arc-V and Yu-Gi-Oh! Vrains. These are the characters that can be currently unlocked by completing their character missions and special events in-game.

Yu-Gi-Oh!

 Yami Yugi
 Seto Kaiba
 Joey Wheeler
 Tea Gardner
 Mai Valentine
 Yugi Muto
 Weevil Underwood
 Rex Raptor
 Mako Tsunami
 Yami Marik
 Yami Bakura
 Bandit Keith
 Ishizu Ishtar
 Odion
 Maximillion Pegasus
 Mokuba Kaiba
 Paradox Brothers
 Arkana
 Bonz
 Espa Roba
 Tristan Taylor
 Lumis and Umbra
 Duke Devlin

Yu-Gi-Oh! GX

 Jaden Yuki
 Zane Truesdale
 Aster Phoenix
 Chazz Princeton
 Alexis Rhodes
 Jesse Anderson
 Dr. Vellian Crowler
 Bastion Misawa
 Syrus Truesdale
 Yubel
 Tyranno Hassleberry
 Sartorius Kumar
 Jaden/Yubel
 Blair Flannigan
 Axel Brodie
 Supreme King Jaden
 Jim “Crocodile” Cook

Yu-Gi-Oh! 5D's

 Yusei Fudo
 Jack Atlas
 Crow Hogan
 Akiza Izinski
 Leo
 Luna
 Officer Tetsu Trudge
 Dark Signer Kalin Kessler
 Dark Signer Carly Carmine
 Dark Signer Rex Goodwin
 Carly Carmine
 Kalin Kessler
 Antinomy
 Primo
 Aporia
 Paradox

Yu-Gi-Oh! The Dark Side of Dimensions

 Seto Kaiba (DSOD)
 Mokuba Kaiba (DSOD)
 Sera (DSOD)
 Aigami (DSOD)
 Scud (DSOD)
 Joey Wheeler (DSOD)
 Yugi Muto (DSOD)
 Téa Gardner (DSOD)
 Bakura (DSOD)

Yu-Gi-Oh! ZEXAL

Yuma Tsukumo and Astral
Bronk Stone
Tori Meadows
Reginald "Shark" Kastle
Kite Tenjo
Quattro
Trey
Anna Kaboom
Rio Kastle
Girag

Yu-Gi-Oh! Arc-V

Yuya Sakaki
Zuzu Boyle
Gong Strong
Sylvio Sawatari
Declan Akaba
Yuto
Sora Perse
Shay Obsidian

Yu-Gi-Oh! VRAINS

Playmaker and Ai
Soulburner
The Gore
Blue Angel
Varis

Reception

Several publications praised Yu-Gi-Oh! Duel Links for simplifying many of the rules of the traditional card game and making it very accessible to new players. AppCritic noted that it would also appeal to veteran players saying, "While this is not a full TCG experience, there’s still a good amount of depth and strategy involved for veteran Yu-Gi-Oh! players." Pocket Gamer praised the presentation of the game saying that "it's all presented in a way that is arguably better than the original anime, and there's even full voice acting delivered by the original voice actors. This not only creates an authentic feel that's second to none, but most importantly, it all adds to the nostalgia and immersion. Ultimately making the player feel like they have literally stepped into the world of Yu-Gi-Oh!."

The game exceeded 65million mobile downloads worldwide by March 2018, and exceeded 80million downloads across PC and mobile devices by 1 November 2018. The game has reached 100million mobile downloads worldwide, . In addition, Steam Spy estimates the game to have more than 2million players on Steam.

The game grossed  in 2016. In the first half of 2021, it grossed , making it the top-grossing card battler mobile game during the period.

In November 2020, Duel Links celebrated the milestone of reaching 5 billion duels.

In March 2022, Duel Links celebrated reaching 150 million downloads worldwide with more than 75 billion cards collected and 7 billion duels done by duelists across the world.

Languages
The game supports established languages in English, French, Italian, German, Spanish (Spain), Portuguese (Brazil), Chinese (Simplified and Traditional), Korean and Japanese. The dubbing voice supports English, Korean, Japanese. Typical for the main card game, but also for the first in an official Yu-Gi-Oh! product, the Russian language later also became available.

References

External links
Official website
Tier list, top decks, guides and reviews

Duel Links
Digital collectible card games
Multiplayer online games
2016 video games
Free-to-play video games
Android (operating system) games
IOS games
Konami games
Video games developed in Japan